Rachiplusia nu is a species of moth in the family Noctuidae. It is found in South America, including Paraguay, Uruguay, southern Brazil, Argentina and Chile.

The wingspan is 28–34 mm.

Larvae have been recorded on tobacco, sunflower, soybean, alfalfa, clover, tomato, spinach and number of other plants.

External links

 Species info

Plusiinae
Moths described in 1852
Moths of South America